Keep You Close is the sixth studio album by Belgian rock band Deus. It was released in Belgium on 17 September 2011, in mainland Europe on 19 September and in the United Kingdom on 3 October. On its first day of release, the album was certified gold in Belgium for sales of 10,000 copies. It was eventually certified platinum on 7 October 2011, denoting sales in excess of 20,000 copies.

Track listing

Personnel
Credits adapted from the liner notes of Keep You Close.

Deus
 Tom Barman – vocals, guitar, keyboards
 Klaas Janzoons – violin, keyboards, vocals, percussion, string arrangements
 Stéphane Misseghers – drums, percussion, vocals, keyboards
 Mauro Pawlowski – guitar, vocals, keyboards, string arrangements
 Alan Gevaert – bass, vocals, guitar, mandolin

Additional personnel

 Els Becu – marimba, vibraphone 
 Dick Beetham – mastering
 Jon Birdsong – bugle, horns, trumpet 
 C. J. Bolland – additional programming, additional recording
 Esmé Bos – backing vocals 
 David Bottrill – production
 Stefan Bracaval – extended flutes 
 Greg Dulli – vocals 
 Olaf Heine – band photography
 Anton Janssens – Rhodes piano 
 Roos Janssens – backing vocals 
 Trijn Janssens – backing vocals 
 Sabine Kabongo – backing vocals 
 Mark Steylaerts Ensemble – strings 
 Adam Noble – co-production, engineering, mixing
 Matthew Oates – cover photography
 Charlotte Timmers – backing vocals 
 Uber and Kosher – artwork
 Piet Van Bockstal – oboe 
 Bram Van Houtte – engineering assistance
 Tim Vanhamel – vocals

Charts

Weekly charts

Year-end charts

Certifications

References

2011 albums
Albums produced by David Bottrill
Deus (band) albums
Universal Music Group albums